Arne Winther (22 January 1926 – 14 February 2000) was a Norwegian footballer. He played in seven matches for the Norway national football team from 1955 to 1962.

References

External links
 

1926 births
2000 deaths
Norwegian footballers
Norway international footballers
Place of birth missing
Association footballers not categorized by position